Allocassine is a genus of flowering plants belonging to the family Celastraceae.

Its native range is Southern Tropical and Southern Africa.

Species:

Allocassine laurifolia

References

Celastraceae
Celastrales genera